Malaya Cup was a tournament held annually by a Malaya Cup committee. This is the second season of Malaya Cup (later known as Malaysia Cup). It were contested by states in Malaya. The final were contested by the southern and northern champions in their respective conference round. Seven states sent their teams, an addition of one from previous tournament. The final were held at Selangor Club Field on 2 September 1922 where Selangor avenged their defeat against Singapore in a rematch of last year final with scoreline 3–2.

Conference Round
Seven teams participated the second edition of the Malaya Cup, Johor, Malacca, Negeri Sembilan, Singapore, Penang, Selangor and Perak. The teams were divided into two conference, the Northern Section and Southern Section. The Northern Section comprises Penang, Selangor and Perak while Southern Section represented by Johor, Negeri Sembilan, Malacca and Singapore.  Each team will play with each other (two games per team) and the winners of each conference will play in the final.  Each win will give the team 2 points while losing will give 0 points. A draw means a point were shared between two teams.

Northern Section

Selangor and Penang have an additional playoff match to decide who will face Southern Section champions on the tournament final.

Northern Section playoff

Southern Section

Final
The final were held at Selangor Club Field on 2 September 1922. The match was a rematch of last year's final, with Selangor avenged their defeat with 3–2 win over Singapore.

Winners

References

External links
1922 Malaya Cup Results by Rec.Sport.Soccer Statistics Foundation(RSSSF)

1922 in Malayan football
Malaysia Cup seasons